is a  mountain, on the border of Maibara, Shiga Prefecture, and Ibigawa, Gifu Prefecture, Japan. It is one of the 100 Famous Japanese Mountains, and is also included on the lists of the 100 Kinki Mountains and the 50 Shiga Mountains. Mount Ibuki is the highest mountain in Shiga Prefecture.

Outline
Mount Ibuki is the highest peak in the Ibuki Mountains, which stretch from north to south along the border of Shiga Prefecture and Gifu Prefecture. Located at the southern end of the mountain chain with the Suzuka Mountains not too far to the south, a small plain at the foot of this mountain, Sekigahara, became one of the most important strategic points throughout Japanese history.

Nature
Since ancient times, Mount Ibuki has also been known for its rich variety of wild plants and animals, as well as for its beautiful shape.

Climate

Mount Ibuki has a humid continental climate (Köppen climate classification Dfb) with mild summers and cold winters. On February 14 1927, 230 centimetres (90.6 in) of snow fell on Mount Ibuki,  which is the highest 24 hour totals in the world on record.

Route
There are two ways to ascend Mount Ibuki. The easiest way is to use the Ibuki Driveway. The summit is a 10-minute walk from the parking lot. There is also a bus going from Sekigahara Station up to the parking lot in the summer months. The alternative method is to simply climb the mountain from its base. Many climbers climb from the Ibuki-Tozanguchi bus stop, which is 10 minutes by bus from Omi-Nagaoka Station on the Tōkaidō Main Line. Until 2011 there was a gondola going to the ski resort Sangome about halfway on the mountain slope. Both have been shut down since then and all the lifts have been removed.

Access
 Ibuki-Tozanguchi Bus Stop of Kokoku Bus from Ōmi-Nagaoka Station or Nagahama Station

Gallery

See also

The 100 Views of Nature in Kansai

References

External links

 Official Home Page of the Geographical Survey Institute in Japan

Mountains of Gifu Prefecture
Mountains of Shiga Prefecture